Zatrephes haxairei is a moth of the family Erebidae. It was first described by Hervé de Toulgoët in 1990. It is found in Ecuador.

References

 

Phaegopterina
Moths described in 1989